Graham Henry Quinn (8 July 1912 – 13 November 1987) was a New Zealand track and field athlete who won a bronze medal at the 1938 British Empire Games.

Early life and family
Born in Gisborne on 8 July 1912, Quinn was the son of John Richard Quinn and Eleanor Clare Quinn (née Buchanan).

Athletics
Quinn won three New Zealand national athletics titles: the 100 yards sprint in 1938; and the 220 yards in 1936 and 1938.

At the 1938 British Empire Games in Sydney, Quinn competed in the 100 yards sprint, in which he finished fifth in his heat and did not progress further. In the men's 220 yards sprint, he placed second in his heat and fifth in his semi-final, and did not progress to the final. He was a member of the New Zealand men's 4 x 440 yards relay team—with Arnold Anderson, Alan Sayers, and Harold Tyrie—that won the bronze medal.

Later life and death
A meat inspector, Quinn served as a gunner with the New Zealand Artillery in the 2nd New Zealand Expeditionary Force during World War II, and took part in a military sports meeting in New Caledonia in May 1943. He died on 13 November 1987, and was buried at Mangere Lawn Cemetery.

References

1912 births
1987 deaths
Sportspeople from Gisborne, New Zealand
New Zealand male sprinters
Athletes (track and field) at the 1938 British Empire Games
Commonwealth Games bronze medallists for New Zealand
Commonwealth Games medallists in athletics
New Zealand military personnel of World War II
Burials at Mangere Lawn Cemetery
Medallists at the 1938 British Empire Games